BinAir Aero Service GmbH is  a German charter airline headquartered in Munich and based out of Essen/Mülheim Airport specializing in ad hoc freight services across Europe.

History
The airline was founded in 1996.

The European Union warned the airline in 2011 to improve its safety or face inclusion in the EU no-flight blacklist of banned airlines. As of 29 October 2018, Bin Air's air operator's certificate has been revoked by the Luftfahrtbundesamt forcing the airline to cease all operations. It eventually regained its license in December 2020.

Fleet

As of May 2022, the BinAir Fleet consists of the following aircraft:

Accidents and incidents
 On 19 January 2010, a Bin Air Swearingen SA-227-DC Metro was damaged when the right main undercarriage collapsed on landing at Stuttgart Airport.

 

 On 7 March 2013, a Bin Air metroliner was responsible for the closure of Dublin Airport's main runway for around 35 minutes when its forward retracting nose wheel collapsed during landing.

References

External links

 Official website

Airlines of Germany
Airlines established in 1996
German companies disestablished in 2018
German companies established in 1996